This article lists players who have captained the Wexford county hurling team in the Leinster Senior Hurling Championship and the All-Ireland Senior Hurling Championship.

List of captains

References

Hurling
Wexford
+Captains